Shinozuka (written: 篠塚) is a Japanese surname. Notable people with the surname include:

, Japanese manga artist
, Japanese-Russian footballer
, Japanese baseball player and coach
, Japanese rally driver
Masanobu Shinozuka, Japanese engineer
, member of Unit 731

See also
Shinozuka Station, a railway station in Ōra, Gunma, Japan

Japanese-language surnames